CYB may refer to:

Charles Kirkconnell International Airport, Cayman Islands, IATA code
Choy Yee Bridge stop, Hong Kong, MTR station code